Tropicos is an online botanical database containing taxonomic information on plants, mainly from the Neotropical realm (Central, and South America). It is maintained by the Missouri Botanical Garden and was established over 25 years ago. The database contains images and taxonomical and bibliographical data on more than 4.2 million herbarium specimens. In addition, it contains data on over 49,000 scientific publications. The database can be queried in English, French, and Spanish. The oldest records in the database go back to 1703.

References

External links

 

 
Online botany databases
Online taxonomy databases
Missouri Botanical Garden